Scieropepla typhicola is a moth of the family Oecophoridae. It was described by Edward Meyrick in 1885. It is found in Australia (the Australian Capital Territory, New South Wales and Queensland) and New Zealand.

The larvae bore in the flower heads of Typha species (including Typha angustifolia).

References

 Scieropepla typhicola in insectin

Moths described in 1917
Oecophoridae
Moths of Australia
Moths of New Guinea